La Rue is an unincorporated community in Union County, in the U.S. state of Illinois.

History
A post office called La Rue was established in 1903, and remained in operation until 1909. The community most likely has the name of a pioneer settler.

References

Unincorporated communities in Union County, Illinois
Unincorporated communities in Illinois